Cataclysta lampetialis is a Crambidae species in the genus Cataclysta. It was described by Francis Walker in 1859, and is known from Australia.

References

Moths described in 1859
Acentropinae